Diridavumab (CR6261) (INN) is a monoclonal antibody designed for the treatment of influenza A.

This drug was developed by Janssen Pharmaceutical Companies of Johnson & Johnson.

References 

Monoclonal antibodies
Experimental drugs